Náuas Esporte Clube, commonly known as Náuas, is a Brazilian football club based in Cruzeiro do Sul, Acre. The club currently competes in Campenato Acreano, the top division of the Acre state football league.

History
The club was founded on October 19, 1923. They competed in the Série D in 2010, when they were eliminated in the First Stage.

Honours

Domestic

State 

 Campeonato Acreano:

 Runners-up (1): 2010

 Campeonato Acreano Segunda Divisão:

 Runners-up (1): 2018

Stadium
Náuas Esporte Clube play their home games at Complexo Esportivo Totão. The stadium has a maximum capacity of 9,000 people.

References

Association football clubs established in 1923
Football clubs in Acre (state)
1923 establishments in Brazil